Dihydroxyflavanone may refer to:

 Liquiritigenin (4',7-dihydroxyflavanone)
 Pinocembrin (5,7-dihydroxyflavanone)